March for Justice may refer to:

 2015 Armenian March for Justice, a march in Los Angeles, California, to demand recognition of the Armenian Genocide
 2017 March for Justice, a march from Ankara to Istanbul to protest against arrests following the July 2016 coup d'état attempt
 Ministers March for Justice, a 2017 demonstration of religious leaders organized by Al Sharpton
 2021 March 4 Justice, a national series of protests in Australia in protest of sexism, misogyny